The Mahsud Scouts is a paramilitary regiment forming part of the Frontier Corps Khyber Pakhtunkhwa (North) in Pakistan. The name alludes to the Mahsud tribe of South Waziristan.

History
The regiment was raised in 1944 and were then split into two units: 1st and 2nd Mahsud Scouts. They were also known as the First and Second Mahsud Battalions. The 1st Scouts became the Maiwand Rifles and the 2nd Scouts dropped the number from their name. The Scouts have also been involved in anti-drugs operations. In 2011-2012, the unit received a number of drug testing kits, through a United Nations programme, to assist in their work against drug smuggling.

Units
 Headquarters Wing
 162 Wing
 164 Wing
 165 Wing
 166 Wing

References

Regiments of the Frontier Corps
Frontier Corps Khyber Pakhtunkhwa (North)